Machina is a clothing brand company specializing in wearable technology based in Mexico City and San Francisco, accelerated by Highway1 and Wayra.

The company attempted to make a MIDI controlling jacket. A 2012 review in TechCrunch called the jacket "a cool concept and an interesting and kinetic way to trigger and control beats and sounds." The company was founded in 2011 by Linda Franco, Antonio Perdigón, and Daniel Fernández de Córdova.

A Kickstarter project in 2013 produced a prototype, with a delay of almost a year behind the projected delivery date. Since then, there have been no substantial updates and the announced open-source hardware has not materialized. The company is currently developing OBE, a jacket for virtual reality with accelerometers and vibration motors.

In 2017 Linda Franco was named one of MIT's innovators under 35, and in 2014 the company appeared as one of Forbes Mexico's 30 under 30.

References

Wearable devices
Clothing companies of Mexico
Jackets